Paul Matthias Dobberstein (September 21, 1872 – July 24, 1954) was a German American priest and architect.

Dobberstein was born in Rosenfeld, Germany to Francis "Frank" Dobberstein and Julia Froehlich.

Father Dobberstein was educated at the university of Deutsch-Krone in Germany and at the St. Francis Seminary, in St. Francis, Wisconsin.  He was ordained on June 30, 1897.

Grottoes

Father Dobberstein is most known for designing and building The Shrine of the Grotto of the Redemption, in West Bend, Iowa, in the Roman Catholic Diocese of Sioux City. This is actually a series of several connected grottoes.  At the neighboring church of Saints Peter and Paul, he also created a fountain and, inside, a majestic nativity scene.

Other religious grottoes designed and built by Dobberstein include:
 Sacred Heart Church: Sioux City, Iowa
 Immaculate Conception Grotto: Carroll, Iowa (now gone)
 Franciscan Convent: Dubuque, Iowa
 Shrine in the St. Rose of Viterbo Convent of the Franciscan Sisters of Perpetual Adoration: La Crosse, Wisconsin (now gone)
 Catholic Cemetery: Wesley, Iowa
 John Brown Park: Humboldt, Iowa

Father Dobberstein's works inspired Mathias Wernerus (who also attended St. Francis Seminary) to build the Dickeyville Grotto in Dickeyville, Wisconsin in 1930, thus starting the grotto building movement in America.

Pastoral career
In addition to his prolific works of art and stone, he led a busy life as the pastor of Saints Peter and Paul in West Bend for more than 57 years.  His signature appears on over a thousand baptism records from his time in the parish.

References
An Explanation of the Grotto of the Redemption

External links
West Bend Grotto

1872 births
1954 deaths
German emigrants to the United States
People from Palo Alto County, Iowa
People from the Kingdom of Württemberg
20th-century American architects
Architects from Iowa
20th-century American Roman Catholic priests
Catholics from Iowa
19th-century American Roman Catholic priests